Major Hotel, also known as Colonial Hotel and Franklin House Apartments, is a historic hotel located at Liberty, Clay County, Missouri. It was designed by the architectural firm Keene & Simpson and built in 1912.  It is a three-story, rectangular brick building with Colonial Revival and Prairie School style design elements.  It features a low-pitched, hipped roof with wide, overhanging eaves and shed-roof dormers and one-story/ full-length verandah porch.  It was rebuilt after a fire in 1934 and converted to a 21-unit apartment building in 1987.

It was listed on the National Register of Historic Places in 1992.

References

Hotel buildings on the National Register of Historic Places in Missouri
Colonial Revival architecture in Missouri
Prairie School architecture in Missouri
Hotel buildings completed in 1912
Buildings and structures in Clay County, Missouri
National Register of Historic Places in Clay County, Missouri
Liberty, Missouri